A Knight Preparing Himself for Combat, in French Un Chevalier se préparant au combat, is a c. 1805 painting by Fleury François Richard. According to the artist's description, the painting depicts a knight praying in the chapel of the Église Saint-Irénée de Lyon, which had been ruined by the Baron des Adrets in 1562.

The 14 by 17 inch oil on wood painting has been in the Museum of Fine Arts of Lyon since 1981.

The painting was shown in the Paris Salon of 1806, and highly praised by Pierre-Jean-Baptiste Chaussard, although he argued that if the date was supposed to be after 1562 as the artist stated, then the armour was of the wrong period, and the walls of the chapel insufficiently ruined.

References

Paintings by Fleury François Richard
Paintings in the collection of the Museum of Fine Arts of Lyon
1805 paintings